Bhandardaha is a census town in Domjur CD Block of Howrah Sadar subdivision in Howrah district in the state of West Bengal, India. It is close to Makardaha and also a part of Kolkata Urban Agglomeration.

Geography
It has an average elevation of 12 metres (39 feet).

Demographics
As per 2011 Census of India, Bhandardaha had a total population of 5,667 of which 2,873 (51%) were males and 2,794 (49%) were females. Population below 6 years was 592. The total number of literates in Bhandardaha was 4,143 (81.64% of the population over 6 years).

Bhandardaha was part of Kolkata Urban Agglomeration in 2011 census.

 India census, Bhandardaha had a population of 4816. Males constitute 50% of the population and females 50%. Bhandardaha has an average literacy rate of 65%, higher than the national average of 59.5%; with male literacy of 70% and female literacy of 60%. 11% of the population is under 6 years of age.

Transport

Bus
Amta Road (part of State Highway 15) is the artery of the town.

Private Bus
 63 Domjur - Howrah Station
 E44 Rampur - Howrah Station
 K11 Domjur - Rabindra Sadan

Mini Bus
 16 Domjur - Howrah Station
 31 Makardaha - Khidirpur
 34 Purash - Howrah Station
 35 Hantal - Howrah Station

CTC Bus
 C11 Domjur - B.B.D. Bagh/Belgachia
 C11/1 Munsirhat - Howrah Station

Bus Routes Without Numbers
 Bargachia - Sealdah Station (Barafkal)
 Pancharul - Howrah Station
 Udaynarayanpur - Howrah Station
 Rajbalhat - Howrah Station
 Tarakeswar - Howrah Station

Train
Makardaha railway station and Domjur Road railway station on  Howrah-Amta line are the nearest railway stations.

References

Cities and towns in Howrah district
Neighbourhoods in Kolkata
Kolkata Metropolitan Area